Africk is a surname. Notable people with the surname include:

Lance Africk (born 1951), American judge
Michael Africk (born 1975), American singer-songwriter, record producer, and entrepreneur